Tutto tutto niente niente is a 2012 Italian film starring comedian Antonio Albanese as his famous character Cetto La Qualunque, a sleazy Southern Italy politician. Albanese also plays the roles of two other main characters: Rodolfo Favaretto, a racist secessionist native of Veneto, and Frengo Stoppato, an addict coming from a Catholic family. All three of them will become, despite a detention, members of Parliament thanks to a parliamentary immunity.The film is a crowds portrait  but not too much of Italy and its corrupt politicians.

It is the sequel to Qualunquemente.

Plot
Cetto La Qualunque (Antonio Albanese) has just become mayor of Marina di Sopra (a small village in Calabria): now the corrupt and ignorant fugitive entrepreneur really wants to lead the entire town by doing nothing and relying on the support of his friends. But soon the officer Lt. Cavallaro manages to trick him and send him to prison along with his entire gang, including the funny Pino "The Stranger" (as for the inhabitants of Calabria citizens of Apulia appear as non-EU citizens). In Veneto in Northern Italy, the manufacturer Rodolfo "Olfo" Favaretto (Albanese) dreams for years to unify the Italian regions of Piedmont, Lombardia, Friuli-Venezia Giulia and Veneto with a long highway to Austria. In fact, as the great secessionist that he is, Olfo wants to bring Italy in the time of eighteenth century when Austro-Hungarian Empire dominated by the entire North. One day he escort a group of criminals who deal in the most inhuman affair from his bunker in Venice to a speedboat guide for channels of the city, making them look like tourists in order to not to be stopped by the police. When Olfo arrives at his shipyard orders to illegal immigrants to get to work to build his "strap" (highway), but a black man falls from the roof of the yard and does not give any sign of life. Rodolfo, in order to have no trouble, tries  to put the body in a plastic bag and throw it in the channel, but the man is not dead and reports it to the police. Frengo Stoppato (still Albanese) is a drug addict who lives happily in Brazil until a call from his mother brings him back in Italy. It is a trick because the woman, telling the son to convert to Catholicism before she dies, manages to make him arrested for drug possession.

Meanwhile, in Rome at Montecitorio some corrupted and petty politicians, decide with the consent of the Secretary of the Prime Minister (Fabrizio Bentivoglio) to replace three MPs that have been recently killed with Cetto, Olfo and Frengo. Among them is also the Prime Minister himself (Paolo Villaggio). Cetto, Rodolfo and Frengo that are treated like royalty, with mansions and luxury apartments, and start having fun and doing nothing all day. Only one thing the Secretary recommended to the three; swear allegiance and never betray him. Their ineptitude, their meanness of character and habits, and particularly their ideals will only create trouble for the government buildings. In fact, the Secretary has made a mistake because he chose not professional "Art of Swindle" and fend for themselves, but of the provincial administrators who think only to their directives. Cetto La Qualunque does not appear even once to the House to vote in Parliament and has not abandoned the sake of having sex with beautiful girls, but a haunting happens to him when he has a brief affair with a transsexual. This is to Cetto is like a sober, it is as if he had been deprived of his dignity because he believes homosexuals of being ugly and unclean and become one of them would be the end. Frengo continues its path to beatification asking for an audience even to the pope Benedict XVI after he caught his attention with a change in the fee for the poor, where most of the gains ended the Cardinals of St. Peter. As if that were not enough, he believes that the family of Jesus, Mary and Joseph is not that perfect precisely because God has fertilized the Madonna and then the carpenter has recognized Christ as his son. Finally Rodolfo begins to hate people of color in a frightening way, not trusting even the gentle and cultured goalkeeper, as he comes from Africa. He plans to destroy only a few natural reserve, shack where the immigrants live and finally dry up the rivers, but in fact the disaster that is going to cause is huge and will be booed by everyone.

Cast
Antonio Albanese: Cetto La Qualunque/Olfo Favaretto/Frengo Stoppato
Fabrizio Bentivoglio: Secretary of the Prime Minister of the Italian Republic
Paolo Villaggio: Prime Minister of the Italian Republic
Luigi Maria Burruano: Entrepreneur friend of Cetto
Lorenza Indovina: Carmen La Qualunque
Nicola Rignanese Pino "O'straniero" (acquisito La Qualunque)
Vito: Mute, advisor to Favaretto

The three characters of the film

Cetto La Qualunque: is the character perfectly managed the madness of mayors and politicians of Italy of today. Even the same last name "La Qualunque" (The Whatever) has a role in the creation of the character of the corrupt politician who thinks only to cultivate his interests in the small town of Marina di Sopra in Calabria. He has links with the Mafia and responds rudely to anyone in the country try to contradict him.Cetto is a cruel man, although in a manner not dictatorial. He is also extremely racist, homophobic and ignorant towards the general culture and of any human right. In this film he is fortunately taken away to prison by the Undersecretary of the Prime Minister and placed as a deputy in the Parliament House. However, he in prison, because it was very famous as a corrupt man, was treated with the highest honors and services, in spite of all the other prisoners, but that does not make much difference Cetto. In the film Cetto, sicro known as a man of himself, begins to have problems. In fact, his ignorance and his cruelty racist repentagli are made by mistake when he has sex with a transsexual, sent to him by the Secretary, a man far more corrupt and pervert him. Cetto has never thought that a man so perfectly womanizer like he may have made a mistake so scary in having homosexual relations. From this point he has a crisis and starts to go by the psychologist, continuing alway to reproach his mistake which can never forgive himself. There is a scene in which he tries to cut even the hand that touched on that fateful male phallus. After a dream scabrosos and detector, Cetto he tells the psychologist who, with a lot of freedom and emancipation, the confirmation that Cetto could simply be homosexual. Cetto this statement goes crazy and starts screaming in terror, losing control of himself. The psychologist, understanding the extreme ignorance of his patient, looks full of compassion. In fact at the beginning of the sessions Cetto had even exchanged the image of Sigmund Freud to the grandfather of the woman! When comes Pino, the faithful friend of Cetto, he is still screaming in fear. When he finds out the answer of the psychologist, he begins to scream in fear too, pointing his gun against the woman, who looks both with great piety. At the end of the film fortunately Cetto be able to forget the traumatic experience with homosexuality in general and having fun in bed with his prostitutes from all over the world.
Rodolfo Favaretto: he is a man who has a blind hatred and scary against all races worldwide. Especially in its aims and cruel inquisitorial stumble poor people of color, often very young. In fact Rodolfo is a Northern League, which is a man who is part of an Italian party which does not recognize attached to the Italian Republic. The laws of this party (actually existing) are declared hatred towards foreigners both Asian and European, violence against gypsies and the other inhabitants of southern Italy and a desire to establish an autonomous state in the Italian Republic, which will be called "Padania" (since they comprise a large part of the Po Valley). In fact Rodolfo would like to build with his crew a big highway that will split a part of Veneto that it may be annexed to Austria. In fact he, breaking away from a branch of the League, said that the whole of Italy at the bottom of that area is the land of the Austrians conquered years before the Wars of Independence to unite Italy. With this construction plan, the town Brachetto di Sotto (the village of Rodolfo) will be connected to a new Austrian city that he himself will merge, called Brachetto di Sopra. But Rodolfo order to fully comply with this project needs a lot of manpower, that many groups of illegal Chinese immigrants and blacks that he is maliciously and violently as slaves. He has not the slightest fear of state intervention and the police, because he knows that Italian politics is corrupt, and that will allow him. Rodolfo is a fact to be as ignorant as his colleague Cetto and is also more cunning, callous and evil to humanity weaker. One day, when a worker of color is believed to be dead after a bad fall, Rodolfo does immediately throw into the sea, while his friends berate him to add a lot to the stone to make it go to the bottom.
When Rodolfo is sent to prison thanks to the testimony of the young workers of color, died for nothing, he begins to fixate on one thing: "Why do blacks now float? Who knew that a black floated? And the only black floating here in Italy I had to find him! "One day the black visits him in prison with all the family and the wife of Rodolfo glad tells him that the worker has decided to forgive him, though he tried to drown him. Faced with this gesture of love Rodolfo shows all ls au cruelty, saying, "You have forgiven me? I do not forgive you for anything! So you learn to float to treason! Please get he off out of my sight!" In other scenes in the movie Rodolfo will start to go crazy more and more with his prejudices against people of color and the Chinese. These trains them as marines to start the secession Italic with Austria, and when he is transferred to a prestigious hotel in Rome because it was just elected honorable, moves back scared in front of the black goalkeeper. he man quietly handed him the key of the apartment, but lalla Rodolfo asks his assistant to take his place, because you do not trust the secret skills of blacks. His assistant offends him, telling him that he is a racist and Rodolfo responds with extreme ignorance by saying that in Italy and in the world you can not integrate the colors black and white. He says: "It would be a great mix! She would like the gray children? not me!".

Frengo Stoppato: the philosophy of Frengo, a madman coming from Apulia, is completely insane. He is a drug dealer who was forced to flee to Brazil to escape from the pursuit of the police in Italy. In Brazil he preaches his philosophy of love and hope without extreme limits of various joints. One day his mother, very Catholic, calls on him to return to Italy. She wants Frengo to become blessed, so that the family will be known throughout the Christian camp in Italy. Frengo also has a sister, shamelessly named by their mother "Maria Assunta Maddalena" (meaning Mary Magdalen of the Assumption), who does nothing but pray desperately from morning to night, hoping to appear in the presence of the Archangel Gabriel. Many members of the family of Frengo are remind us of the Italian Baroque climate of 1600. Because of the extreme corruption that runs as a disease in the sphere of politics and in the offices of the Pope, Frengo succeeds easily and even admirably in overturning the peaceful atmosphere of the exemplary Christian family and other principles established over time by the Church. Because he is dangerous, Frengo will be silenced, along with two of his colleagues, in the grotesque policy.

Sequel
Cetto c'è, senzadubbiamente (2019) is the sequel, and probably last film of this trilogy.

External links
 

2012 films
Italian comedy films
2010s Italian-language films
Films set in Rome
Films shot in Rome
Italian sequel films